John Herbert King (16 April 1871 – 18 November 1946) was a cricketer who played first-class cricket for Leicestershire County Cricket Club between 1895 and 1925. He also played one Test match for the England cricket team, which was against Australia at Lord's in 1909.  He did the double, of 1,000 runs and 100 wickets, in 1912 and 11 years later, when he was 52 years old, scored his second double century.

After retiring as a cricketer, aged 52, he continued his involvement in the game as an umpire for another 11 years.

He had two benefits at Leicestershire: the first in 1910, the second in 1923.

King is the last batsman to have been given out Hit the ball twice in a first-class game in England, when in the match against Surrey at the Oval in 1906 King stopped the ball from running onto his stumps by hitting it a second time, and then attempted to run a single.

References
 
Cricinfo page on John King
CricketArchive page on John King
Scorecard of the game in which King was out hit the ball twice

1871 births
1946 deaths
England Test cricketers
English cricketers
Leicestershire cricketers
People from Lutterworth
Cricketers from Leicestershire
Players cricketers
Marylebone Cricket Club cricketers
North v South cricketers
A. J. Webbe's XI cricketers